Jacqueline is a 1959 West German comedy film directed by Wolfgang Liebeneiner and starring Johanna von Koczian, Walther Reyer and Götz George. George won a German Film Award for best newcomer for his performance.

It was shot at the Tempelhof Studios and on location in Munich and Vienna. The film's sets were designed by the art director Werner Schlichting.

Cast
 Johanna von Koczian as Jacqueline
 Walther Reyer as Paul Büttner 
 Götz George as Gustav Bäumler
 Hans Söhnker as Zander, Theaterdirektor
 Eva Maria Meineke as Charlotte Christens
 Gretl Schörg a Frau Burg
 Alexa von Porembsky as Frau Klose
 Walter Ladengast as Nöll, Dramaturg	
 Erik Frey as Bolingbroke
 Alexander Hunzinger as Wirt
 Horst Tappert as Haack, Journalist
 Hans Pfleger as Bonte
 Paula Braend as Fischfrau
 Ernst Brasch as Portier
 Mady Dettmann as Gemüsefrau
 Herta Fahrenkrog as Junge Frau 
 Otto Friebel as Kaufhausbode 
 Franz Loskarn as Türöffner
 Paula Menari as Garderobefrau
 Gisela Reiche as Sekretärin im Theater

References

Bibliography 
 Bock, Hans-Michael & Bergfelder, Tim. The Concise CineGraph. Encyclopedia of German Cinema. Berghahn Books, 2009.

External links 
 

1959 films
West German films
German comedy films
1959 comedy films
1950s German-language films
Films directed by Wolfgang Liebeneiner
UFA GmbH films
Films shot at Tempelhof Studios
Films shot in Vienna
1950s German films